The 2002 Internazionali Femminili di Palermo was a women's tennis tournament played on outdoor clay courts in Palermo, Italy that was part of the Tier V category of the 2002 WTA Tour. It was the 15th edition of the Internazionali Femminili di Palermo and took place from 8 July until 14 July 2002. Sixth-seeded Mariana Díaz Oliva won the singles title and earned $16,000 first-prize money.

Finals

Singles

 Mariana Díaz Oliva defeated  Vera Zvonareva, 6–7(6–8), 6–1, 6–3
It was Díaz Oliva's only singles title of her career.

Doubles

 Evgenia Kulikovskaya /  Ekaterina Sysoeva defeated  Lubomira Bacheva /  Angelika Rösch, 6–4, 6–3

References

External sources
 ITF tournament edition details
 Tournament draws

Torneo Internazionali Femminili di Palermo
Torneo Internazionali Femminili di Palermo
Internazionali Femminili di Palermo
Torneo